Initiative 872 was a 2004 ballot initiative that replaced the open primary being used in Washington state with a top-two nonpartisan blanket primary. It was challenged in court up to the US Supreme Court, which upheld the top-two primary in Washington State Grange v. Washington State Republican Party.

Background
The blanket primary in Washington State was started by an Initiative to the Legislature filed in 1934 and passed in 1935.  The political parties in Washington tried numerous times to have an open or closed primary system implemented, and it even filed a lawsuit that was decided by the Washington State Supreme Court in 1936. The state was represented in that lawsuit by Warren Magnuson.

The political parties in Washington State filed another lawsuit against it in 2000 when the blanket primary in California was overturned by California Democratic Party v. Jones and won the case.

The Washington State Legislature passed a new primary system in 2004, which would have created a new top-two primary system, with an open primary as a backup, giving the Governor the option to choose. Secretary of State Sam Reed advocated for the top-two, but on April 1, 2004, the Governor used the line-item veto to activate the open primary instead.

2004 campaign
Initiative 872 was filed on January 8, 2004 by Terry Hunt from the Washington Grange. The language of the ballot measure summary was as follows:

This measure proposes a new system for conducting primaries for partisan offices. This proposal continues current practice of permitting voters to vote for any candidate for any office in primary and general elections, without limitation based on party. The two "top" candidates with the most votes in the primary advance to the general election. Candidates continue to designate their party. It becomes effective only if the court decision invalidating the traditional blanket primary becomes final.

The political parties in Washington opposed I-872 because they felt it would create an opportunity for someone not directly associated with the party to claim the party name on the ballot.

The measure passed with 1,632,225 yes votes and 1,095,190 no votes in 2004.

More lawsuits
On July 15, 2005, the initiative 872 was declared unconstitutional by the Ninth Circuit Court of Appeals.

On March 18, 2008, the US Supreme Court reversed the decision and upheld 872.

Top two primary implementation
The decision to uphold 872 changed the implementation of the 2008 primary election, which was held on August 19.

2008 election
In 2008, two State Senate races and five House of Representatives elections had either two Democrats or two Republicans get through the primary election, appearing together on the general election ballot.

The results of a study from Gonzaga University comparing the results in Washington state between the 2004 (closed) and 2008 (top two) primaries, indicate that the top two primary overall reduced the likelihood of running against a same party candidate and it reduced the likelihood that a strong incumbent would face a challenger from his or her own party.

References

External links
Blanket Primary Website from the Washington Grange.
The NW Progressive Institute opposes the Top-two primary

872
Washington 2004
Electoral reform referendums
Electoral system ballot measures in the United States